Kristine McDivitt Tompkins (born in 1950) is the president and co-founder of Tompkins Conservation, an American conservationist, former CEO of Patagonia, Inc., a UN Patron of Protected Areas from 2018-2022. She has committed her career to protecting and restoring Chile and Argentina’s wild beauty and biodiversity by creating national parks, restoring wildlife, inspiring activism, and fostering economic vitality as a result of conservation. Having protected over 14 million acres of parklands in Chile and Argentina through Tompkins Conservation and its partners, Kristine and Douglas Tompkins, her late husband who died in 2015, are considered some of the most successful national park-oriented philanthropists in history.

Early life 
Born in southern California, Kristine McDivitt spent most of her childhood on her great-grandfather’s ranch, which was formative in fostering her connection to the natural world. She spent some early years in Venezuela, where her father worked for an oil company.  At age 15, she met and befriended rock climbing legend and equipment manufacturer Yvon Chouinard; he gave her a summer job working for Chouinard Equipment. Kris attended college at the College of Idaho in Caldwell, where she ski-raced competitively.

At Patagonia, Inc. 
Beginning in 1973, Kris returned to California and worked for her friends from her teenage years, Yvon and Malinda Chouinard, eventually helping to build Patagonia, Inc. She helped Yvon Chouinard turn his fledgling piton business into Patagonia, Inc. Kris became the company’s first CEO and collaborated with the Chouinards to build Patagonia, Inc into a renowned “anti-corporation” and a leader in the outdoor apparel industry. In 1980, Patagonia started to donate 10 percent of their profits to environmental organizations such as Earth First! In 1984, the company formed the "One Percent for the Planet Club", which donates either 1% of sales or 10% of profits—whichever is greater—to environmental causes.

Conservation work 

In 1993, Kris retired from Patagonia, Inc, married Doug Tompkins (founder of The North Face and co-founder of Esprit), and the couple left their careers as business leaders of iconic American brands to devote their funds, time, and passion to mitigating the climate and extinction crises. The Tompkins decided to focus their efforts on national parks as they represent the “gold standard” of conservation—offering a unique set of ecological, cultural, and economic benefits, while also guaranteeing long-term conservation. Their conservation work has been carried out through a suite of nonprofits, including, Conservation Land Trust and Conservacion Patagonica, all of which have now consolidated under Tompkins Conservation. Tompkins Conservation now works to rewild the Southern Cone, working closely with strategic allies and offspring organizations - Rewilding Chile and Rewilding Argentina.

In 1991, Doug Tompkins began acquiring private land for conservation purposes in Chile’s Los Lagos Region. Over the years, Doug and Kris Tompkins and their team assembled the world’s largest private nature reserve and managed it as a public-access park in the threatened Valdivian temperate rainforest. Pumalín Park received official nature sanctuary status in 2005 and was designated a national park in 2018, prompted by Tompkins Conservation’s donation of almost 725,000 acres for the new, roughly 1-million-acre park, Pumalin Douglas Tompkins National Park, named in honor of its founder.

The Tompkins' conservation efforts expanded to Argentina, starting with the Iberá Wetlands of the Corrientes province. In the wetland ecosystem, they have launched projects to reintroduce extirpated species, such as the giant anteater, jaguar, red-and-green macaw, and giant river otter. The rewilding work in Ibera, as well as many other projects in the country, is now carried out by Rewilding Argentina, the team assembled by Kris and Doug, led by Sofia Heinonen.

After years of collaborating with governments, local organizations, scientists, philanthropists, and communities, in January 2018 Kris, on behalf of Tompkins Conservation, and Chilean President Michelle Bachelet signed decrees to create five new national parks in Chile and expand three others, adding a total of more than 10 million acres of new national parklands to Chile. For scale, that is more than three times the size of Yosemite and Yellowstone combined, or approximately the size of Switzerland. With one million acres of land from Tompkins Conservation and an additional 9 million acres of federal land from Chile, this has been billed as the largest donation of land from a private entity to a country in history.

As the president of Tompkins Conservation, Kristine Tompkins currently oversees a multitude of projects in Chile and Argentina working toward creating parklands, marine conservation areas and fighting the extinction crisis via rewilding, the process of protecting and restoring land and waters, wildlife, and natural systems.

Tompkins serves in various positions of global leadership in conservation, including as Chair of National Geographic Society’s Last Wild Places campaign. She was the first conservationist to be awarded the Carnegie Medal of Philanthropy. In 2018 she was named the United Nations’ Global Patron for Protected Areas. Her 2020 TED Talk, entitled Make the World Wild Again, discusses the critical role we all have to play to heal the planet.

Conservación Patagónica 

Conservación Patagónica (CP) was founded by Kris Tompkins in 2000 as an NGO focused on creating new national parks in Patagonia that protect and restore wildlands, biodiversity, and communities.  CP's first project was the establishment of Monte Leon National Park, Argentina’s first coastal national park. In 2001, CP purchased Estancia Monte León, one of the oldest sheep ranches in Argentine Patagonia, located on the southern Atlantic shoreline a few hundred miles north of the Strait of Magellan. Monte León had long been one of the priorities for Argentine National Parks because of its richness and diversity of species, including Magellanic penguins, sea lions, elephant seals, leopard seals, and several migratory seabirds. CP purchased this  estancia, crafted a master plan for its transition to a national park and, in 2002, donated the property to the Argentine National Parks Administration, creating the Monte León National Park, the first coastal national park in Argentina.

In 2003, CP had the opportunity to purchase Estancia Valle Chacabuco, a historic sheep ranch in Chile's Aysén Region. The Chilean National Parks had made this ranch their number-one conservation priority for more than 35 years because it sits between two existing National Reserves, namely Jeinimeni and Tamango, together . This area is prime habitat for the endangered huemul deer, one of Chile's national animals. After developing a public-access infrastructure system, including a trail system, visitor center, campgrounds, lodging, and a restaurant, CP donated Patagonia Park to the Chilean park service. Along with the two adjoining National Reserves, this became the Patagonia National Park, a flagship park for Latin America. Stretching between two of the country's largest lakes, Lago General Carrera and Lago Cochrane, the park contains an impressive diversity of landscapes: arid Patagonian steppe, Southern Beech forests, wetlands, high peaks, alpine lakes, and streams. As the president of CP, Tompkins was heavily involved in every aspect of this project, from landscape restoration to infrastructure construction. Tompkins and her team are some of the few throughout the world currently practicing this movement.

Recognition

Awards and honors received by Kristine Tompkins

Honors 
 2019 Selected for WOMEN: The National Geographic Image Collection
 2009 Honorary Degree, College of Idaho

Awards 
 2023 American Prairie's Ken Burns American Heritage Prize 
 2022 Kyoto Earth Hall of Fame 
 2022 Senckenberg Prize for Nature Commitment 
 2021 Rachel Carson Award, National Audubon Society
 2019 AFAR Vanguard Award for travel visionaries 
 2019 Foundation Credicorp Capital 2019 Award (Chile)
 2018 Recognition for Lifetime Contribution to the Chilean wilderness, Chilean-North American Business Bureau 
 2018 Luis Oyarzún Award granted by the Universidad Austral de Chile 
 2017 Woodrow Wilson Award for Corporate Citizenship, Woodrow Wilson Center
 2017 Jackson Hole Wildlife Film Festival Legacy Award
 2017 Carnegie Medal of Philanthropy 
 2017 Cynthia Pratt Laughlin Medal, Garden Club of America
 2017 Outdoor Inspiration Award, presented by Adidas Outdoor at Outdoor Retailer
 2017 National Geographic Adventurer of the Year (nominee)
 2016 Lowell Thomas Award, The Explorers Club
 2016 World Tourism Award, World Travel Market
 2016 BBVA Foundation Award for Biodiversity Conservation in Latin America
 2016 David R. Brower Award, American Alpine Club
 2016 Sustainability Leader, “Uniting Global Philanthropy Inspiring Action For The Planet,” East-West Sustainability Summit, IUCN World Conservation Congress
 2016 Recyclápolis Award, Fundación Recyclápolis (Chile)

Awards received by Douglas and Kristine Tompkins 
 2007 Gold Steward Award, International Conservation Caucus Foundation
 2008 World Rainforest Award, Rainforest Action Network
 2008 Environmental Award, Bruno H. Schubert Foundation
 2010 International Visionary Award, Scenic Hudson
 2010 International BAUM Special Award, B.A.U.M (German Association for Environmental Management)
 2012 New Species Award, African Rainforest Conservancy
 2013 Conservation Achievement Award, Bird Life International
 2015 Long View Conservation Award, Mohonk Preserve, NY
 2015 Global Economy Prize, Kiel Institute for the World Economy
 2017 Outdoor Inspiration Awards at Outdoor Retailer - Lifetime Achievement Award

See also

References 

Living people
1950 births
American conservationists
People from Santa Barbara County, California
American chief executives of fashion industry companies
Nature conservation in Argentina
Nature conservation in Chile
American expatriates in Chile
Activists from California